The Terrell–Reuss Streets Historic District is a  historic district in Cuero, Texas.  It includes works of significance from 1883 on.  It includes works by Jules Leffland and other architects.  It was listed on the National Register of Historic Places in 1988;  the listing included 63 contributing buildings.

See also

National Register of Historic Places listings in DeWitt County, Texas

References

DeWitt County, Texas
Historic districts on the National Register of Historic Places in Texas
National Register of Historic Places in DeWitt County, Texas